This is an alphabetical list of all the songs known to have been recorded in studio by Dalida between 1954 and 1987.
The list contains a total of 696 songs in 9 different languages.

All songs were released during or after Dalida's lifetime, either on vinyl or CD or as a music video on TV or DVD, except 2 songs that didn't receive any public broadcast or release, but are internet leaked unofficially.

From all songs first released on vinyl, all of them have been eventually digitally remastered and released on CD, except 16 songs.

All songs are organised by language and type, with brackets containing a date of first release. The songs which were first released posthumously since 1987 have two dates; first indicating the year of creation and second the year of release.

The list also has extension with 18 songs that are not counted (as studio recordings) because they were either sang live and never recorded in studio for commercial release, or short advertisement soundtracks.

French

A

B

C

D

E

F 
Fado (1956)
Femme (1983)
Femme est la nuit (1977)
Fini, la comédie (1981)
Flamenco bleu (1956)

G

H 
Héléna (1958)
Hey, love (1970)
Histoire d'aimer (1977)
Histoire d'un amour (1957)

I

J

K 
Kalimba de luna (1984)

L

M

N

O 
Ô Seigneur Dieu pourquoi m'as-tu abandonné? (1973)
Oh! la la (1957)

P

Q

R

S

T

U

V

Z 
 (1969)

Recorded for TV series 
Unlike the previous songs of the list, the songs listed below were recorded in studio specifically for Dalida's appearances in musical TV series, and one for soundtrack of comedy TV series "L'auberge de la Licorne" in which she did not appear.

Posthumously released 
Songs below were unreleased during Dalida's lifetime.

Unfinished 
Dalida recorded 5 demos or sketches that eventually remained unfinished and unreleased during her life. "Ma vie", "Mesdames, messieurs…" and "Solitude" were posthumously compiled and released as one song titled "Chansons inachevées" in 1989.

C'est facile avec toi (1959 or 1960/2012)
Ma vie (1974)
Mesdames, messieurs… (1974)
Quand tu n'es pas là (1959/2012)
Solitude (1970)

Italian

Recorded for TV series 
The songs below, unlike the previous ones on the list, were recorded in studio specifically for Dalida's appearances in musical TV series.

Aria di Parigi (duet with Alberto Lupo for "Partitissima"; 1967)
Carnaby Street (duet with Patty Pravo for "Partitissima"; 1967)
La prima cosa bella (duet with Massimo Ranieri; 1971)

Posthumously released 
Songs below were unreleased during Dalida's lifetime.

Unreleased 
These songs are known to have been recorded by Dalida, and have leaked on internet, but have never been officially released.

Lasciami stare (a.k.a. Domani tu ti sposerai; 1963)
Questa è la mia terra (1963)

German

Posthumously released 
Songs below were unreleased during Dalida's lifetime.

Hab mich lieb (1958/2008)
Ich fand ein Herz in Portofino (1959/2008)

Spanish

Posthumously released 
The song below was unreleased during Dalida's lifetime.

Déjame bailar (1979/1992)

English

Posthumously released 
Songs below were unreleased during Dalida's lifetime.

Arabic 
Egyptian
Aghani aghani (1982; Arabic: أغانى أغانى)
Ahsan nass (1985; Arabic: أحسن ناس)
Gamil el soura (1983; Arabic: جميل الصوره)
Helwa ya balady (1979; Arabic: حلوه يا بلدى)
Salma ya salama (1977; Arabic: سالمه يا سلامه)
Fattan Ya Leil Fattan (film "L'Or du Nil - Le Masque de Toutankhamon"; 1954/2021; Arabic: فتان يا ليل)

Lebanese
Lebnane (1986/1989; Arabic: لبنان)

Japanese 
Amore scusami (1974)
Gigi l'amoroso (1964)
Juuhassai no kare (1974)
O sole mio (1964)

Flemish 
Ik zing amore (1959)
Speel niet met m'n hart (1959)

Hebrew 
Hene ma tov (1965)

Bilingual songs 
French-Hebrew
Hava naguila (a.k.a. Dansons mon amour; 1959; Hebrew: הבה נגילה)

French-Italian
Come prima (a.k.a. Tu me donnes; 1958)
Love in Portofino (1959)
Ho trovato la felicità (1960/2007)

French-Spanish
La violetera (1956)

Other

Advertisement soundtracks 
Although they are recorded in studio, they are not counted as recorded songs as they are jingles.
Adaptation of Gigi l'amoroso (Air freshner "Wizard sec"; 1986)
Untitled (Orange juice "Bali"; 1976)

Songs 
Below are listed 16 songs that are known to be performed by Dalida during a concert, film, TV or radio appearance in period from 1954 to 1987. They have never been recorded in studio, thus are not counted as songs recorded for release. Eventually some of them were released as music video or on albums.

References

Notes

Sources

Bibliography 
 Dalida Official Website 

Dalida